Union High School, located in Big Stone Gap, Virginia, is part of Wise County Public Schools. Union High School is a consolidated school, serving students from Appalachia and Big Stone Gap.

History
Union High School originally opened in mid-August 2011. The school was formed with the consolidation of Appalachia High School and Powell Valley High School during late 2010-2011 under the direction of Wise County Public Schools in a plan that brought the number of high schools in the county from six to three.

The name Union represents the unity between the two former rivals and serves as the goal of the student body to come together as a single group. The mascot and colors are a combination of the rival school's colors into a unity (Baby Blue and Royal Blue into Navy Blue; Red and Gold into Orange), and the bear is a good choice due to the location of the school in the Appalachian Mountains.

For the 2011 school year, studies and sporting events (with the exception of football) were held in the existing building formerly known as Powell Valley High School. The building was fixed to act as a neutral zone, being repainted in the new school's colors, given new exterior signs to represent the change and a complete renovation to the gym including new court markings and pads with the school's colors and name on them. A new facility was constructed behind the current site at Powell Valley, and the new school opened in August 2014.

Location
The school is located close to the Orby Cantrell Highway just outside Big Stone Gap, Virginia. The building is placed in a small area of land that also holds Union Primary School and Union Middle School, and has its own street name (Two Champions Avenue) designated to it. Though this street is not physically marked by VDOT, it does act as the official mailing address for Union High School.

The current school has, in addition to the main building, a field house, a football practice field, and a high school regulation baseball field. Union High School is the only school in the county that does not have its own football complex, with all games being held at Bullitt Park in downtown Big Stone Gap.

After the resurrection of the new Union High School facility, the old Powell Valley High School was demolished and new parking facilities for the school housed on the site of the old school building, and a park-like area placed between the campus and main-road as an aesthetic addition.

After the anticipated additional influx of traffic added to the school by the closing of Appalachia Elementary School in June 2017 and to resolve traffic issues already present, a modern mini-roundabout was added at the intersection of Two Champions Avenue, Shawnee Avenue E, and north and south-bound traffic on Powell Valley Road (State Route 610).  The project was completed just in the nick of time for the 2017-2018 school year to begin and a ribbon-cutting ceremony was conducted on August 1, 2017 with the first day of school scheduled for August 3, 2017.  A group of UHS students played a big part in the project, built with $125,000 in county coal and gas severance tax funds. Under the guidance of UHS teacher and FCCLA Leader Connie Carico, the UHS Family, Career and Community Leaders of America (FCCLA) members researched driver safety issues at the school, conducted traffic count and pattern assessments, and were both organizers and participants in committee meetings with community partners, an effort that gave rise to the roundabout project.  Those students won an FCCLA 2017 National FACTS: Roadway Safety Achievement (RSA) Award for their efforts and traveled to Washington, D.C. on August 8, 2017 to provide a presentation on the project.

Athletics
Union High School has been highly successful in athletics. The Bears have won state championships in boys' cross country, golf and boys' basketball while having numerous individual champions in swimming, wrestling and track field and field.

The football program is consistently one of the better teams in the area as well. Union has won over 75 percent of its games since opening while twice appearing in the state semifinals under coach Travis Turner. 

The school's most recent state title was in boys' basketball where coach Zack Moore's Bears defeated East Rockingham 62-47 for the 2021 Class 2 State Title. 

In girls' basketball, Union has made two final four appearances and has a state runner up to its credit in the short time the school has been open.

Arts
The Union High School Marching Bears also saw a successful first season under the direction of former Appalachia director, Kimberly Sturgill. Averaging at 96 members, the band went on to win numerous awards at the four festivals they participated in during the season, including Division I Superior ratings at every competition. The drum majors at Union were noted for winning 1st Overall at three of the four competitions they visited in their 2011-year, and the band won the highest honor of Grand Champion at the Letcher County Central Marching Invitational in October 2011. In the years following the consolidation, the band has been successful in many of the competitions they have participated in. The marching bears have come to be well respected in their area and have competed in competitions in Kentucky, West Virginia, and Tennessee. The UHS Band has become one of the top bands in Southwestern Virginia and competes alongside many other top names such as Virginia High School, Chilhowie High School, John Battle High School, Sullivan South High School, and Richlands High School. The band program at Union has approximately 80 members.

The Marching Bears also continued the legacy held by the former Powell Valley Viking Band in holding the 31st Annual McChesney Band Festival in honor of Mrs. Virginia McChesney, who taught at both Appalachia and Powell Valley in her day.

The Union High School Forensics team also experienced a successful first season. The original team consisted of 19 members under the direction of Christy Kelley, many of which advanced to the Regional competition. Three students from Union advanced to the State competition in Harrisonburg, Virginia. The three members placed 1st, 7th, and 8th in their respective divisions of the competition.

The Union High one-act team also participates in competitions every year and planned to perform a comedy in 2013.

Notable alumni
 Thomas Jones, former NFL running back, attended Powell before consolidation. Played at Virginia, drafted by the Arizona Cardinals 1st round 7th overall 2000 NFL Draft.
 Julius Jones, former NFL running back, attended Powell before consolidation. Played at Notre Dame, drafted by the Dallas Cowboys 2nd round 43rd overall 2004 NFL Draft.
 James Mitchell, Played at Virginia Tech, drafted by the Detroit Lions 5th round 177th overall 2022 NFL Draft.

References

External links 
 Union High website

Public high schools in Virginia
Schools in Wise County, Virginia
Educational institutions established in 2011
2011 establishments in Virginia